AXB may refer to:

Air India Express, India, ICAO airline code AXB
Maxson Airfield, Alexandria Bay, New York, former IATA airport code AXB
Boeing AXB, a variant of the Boeing P-12 1930s aircraft

See also